The 63rd 500 Mile International Sweepstakes was held at the Indianapolis Motor Speedway in Speedway, Indiana, on Sunday May 27, 1979. Second-year driver Rick Mears took the lead for the final time with 18 laps to go, and won his first of four Indianapolis 500 races. It was also Mears' first of a record six Indy 500 pole positions. Brothers Al and Bobby Unser combined to lead 174 of the 200 laps, but Al dropped out around the midpoint, and Bobby slipped to 5th place at the finish nursing mechanical issues. It was also Roger Penske's second Indy 500 victory as a car owner.

The race was sanctioned by USAC, and was part of the 1979 USAC National Championship. However, many of the participants entered the race only as a one-off, and instead broke off and took part in the inaugural 1979 SCCA/CART Indy Car Series. It was the beginning of the first open-wheel "split".

The month of May 1979 was filled with controversy on and off the track. A court injunction was issued after USAC initially denied entries by some teams that were part of the CART series. During time trials, several cars were disqualified due to illegal wastegate exhaust pipes. Qualifying closed with the traditional 33 cars in the field. However, the day before the race a special qualifying session was held to allow certain entries a last chance to qualify. Two additional cars were added to the field, for a total of 35 cars (the most since 1933).

The high tensions and technical squabbles during the month attracted considerable negative criticism from sports writers and media. The race itself, however, was competitive and entertaining, and completed without major incident or controversy.

Among those in attendance was former president Gerald Ford. Ford also served as the grand marshal of the 500 Festival Parade. The 1979 race is also notable in that it was the first to utilize the "pack-up" rule during caution periods, eliminating the virtual safety car rules ("Electro-PACER") used from 1972 to 1978. The pace car, which started the race, would now lead the field under the yellow flag.

Race schedule

A fifth day of time trials (May 26) was added to resolve a controversy that arose during qualifying (see below).

Controversies

USAC/CART "Split"
Following the death of Indianapolis Motor Speedway president Tony Hulman in 1977, and the tragic 1978 USAC plane crash, owners and participants in Indy car racing were anxious to reorganize the sport. By 1978, a growing dissent amongst the participants was based on many factors, including poor promotion and low revenue. In addition, the venerable 4-cylinder turbo Offenhauser (a favorite of the USAC-loyal teams) was at a horsepower disadvantage to the new V8 Cosworth DFX. USAC began retooling turbocharger boost rules to ensure the Offy and the "stock block" engines remained competitive, which caused new disagreements about equivalency formulas and favoritism. Though some think the plane crash was used as an opportunistic way to force change in the sport, it was merely a coincidence, more aptly described as a concomitant result. The seed of dissent had been growing for several years before the accident, and claims the crash was an immediate cause for the 1979 USAC/CART "split" are considered for the most part unfounded.

Indy car events outside of Indianapolis were suffering from poor attendance, and few events were even televised. Robin Miller even accused the Speedway of offering a purse that was too low considering the stature of the event and the costs of racing at the time. In late 1978, several existing Indy car owners broke off and created the CART series, with some initial assistance from the SCCA (in order to be recognized by ACCUS). Immediately there was conflict and disagreement. Further complicating the issue were rumors that Goodyear was considering pulling out of the sport. Driver, owner, and advocate Dan Gurney then published his infamous "White Paper," lobbying several complaints and charges against USAC and IMS, concluding that new organization (i.e., CART) was necessary to ensure the success of Indy car racing into the future.

The first major salvo was made on March 25, 1979, when the CART-based teams boycotted the USAC Datsun Twin 200 at Ontario. A. J. Foyt, who at first sided with the CART contingent, retracted his loyalty, and crossed back over to the USAC side. After the boycott, Foyt suggested that USAC should penalize the CART-based teams, and refuse their entries to the Indy 500. Among the drivers affected were Bobby Unser, Al Unser, Johnny Rutherford, Danny Ongais, Gordon Johncock, Steve Krisiloff, and Wally Dallenbach – some of the top names in the sport.

Three days before the published deadline, CART president U. E. "Pat" Patrick delivered a block of 44 entries to the 1979 Indianapolis 500 for the CART-based teams. On April 19, however, the USAC board of directors voted unanimously to reject the entries of six key teams: Penske, Patrick, McLaren, Fletcher, Chaparral, and Gurney. These six teams (19 cars) were alleged to be "harmful to racing" and "not in good standing with USAC." USAC sent the owners a telegram informing them of the situation while they were participating in the CART race at Atlanta, the Gould Twin Dixie 125s.

On April 26, the "rejected six" teams filed suit in the U.S. District Court for the Southern District of Indiana, requesting an injunction to allow the teams to compete in the 1979 Indy 500. They cited antitrust and restraint of trade. On May 5, judge James Ellsworth Noland issued the injunction, but restrained the teams from disrupting or interfering with the running of the event.

Illegal wastegate manifolds
During the month, a second controversy erupted regarding the technical regulations of the turbocharger wastegate. The specifications called for wastegate exhaust pipes to be a minimum of 1.470 inches (inside diameter). The standard pipe diameter was typically 2 inches. In addition, the pop-off valves affixed to the cars were to be set at 50 inHg of "boost" for qualifying (down from 80 inHg). USAC issued a last-minute ruling that in-car adjustments of the boost dial would be banned during time trials.

A few teams discovered what they considered a "loophole" in the rules. They utilized a larger diameter wastegate pipe, but welded a washer inside of it that had a circular opening of exactly 1.470 inches. This had the effect of creating back pressure, in hopes of over-riding the pop-off valve, and thus over-boosting the engine, and increasing horsepower.

On May 19 (the third day of time trials) the cars of Dick Ferguson, Steve Krisiloff, and Tom Bigelow were disqualified and fined $5,000 because they "had altered their wastegate exhaust pipes by the addition of restrictions which significantly affect the air flow." USAC charged that the teams had tampered with the wastegate exhaust pipe, thus illegally over-riding the pop-off valve, and potentially over-boosting the engine. An appeal was made the next morning, but USAC denied the appeal. Furthermore, they released a memo which stated that any cars qualifying on Sunday May 20 must have unrestricted wastegate pipes (no washers were allowed to be welded inside) that are exactly 1.470 inches in diameter or greater.

The ruling created controversy in the garage area, as a further examination of the rules showed a "gray area" regarding the inlet opening configuration. In addition, several complaints surfaced when teams charged USAC with essentially changing the rules in the middle of qualifying – a move which actually affected other already-qualified cars from the first weekend.

The controversy ultimately led to a fifth day of time trials, held the day before the race. Eleven entries that were identified as being denied a fair attempt to qualify were allowed to participate. Each car was allowed one attempt, and if they completed their run faster than the slowest car already in the field, they would qualify for the starting grid. The ruling allowed for a potential 44-car field on race day. Only two cars accomplished the feat, and they were added to the back of the grid for a field of 35 cars.

Practice – Week 1

Saturday May 5
Opening Day saw sparse activity. Only three cars took to the track, with Larry "Boom Boom" Cannon earning the honor of first car on the track. Later in the day, judge James Ellsworth Noland issued the injunction requested by the CART teams, and all entries were allowed to practice.

Sunday May 6
The previously rejected CART teams arrived at the garage area, but none took to the track.

Monday May 7
Spike Gehlhausen had the only incident of the day, when a water line broke, spewing hot fluid into the cockpit. He suffered first and second degree burns, but was cleared to drive.

Tuesday May 8

Wednesday May 9

Thursday May 10

Friday May 11
Moisture kept the track closed until 1:10 p.m., meaning only 2 hours and 10 minutes were lost due to weather all month thus far. A. J. Foyt finished the week with the top practice speed, and Rick Mears had several hand-timed laps in the  range.

Time Trials – Weekend 1

Pole Day – Saturday May 12
Rain kept the track closed on pole day until after 4 p.m. At 4:19 p.m., the track opened for practice, with the temperature 55 °F and winds up to 12 mph. During the first practice session, Danny Ongais, a favorite for the front row, wrecked in turn 4 after completing a lap of 191.205 mph. He was pinned in the car for over twenty minutes, and suffered a concussion. He was taken to Methodist Hospital for observation, and returned to his home in Costa Mesa, California, for a few days to recuperate.

The crash by Ongais kept the track closed for 40 minutes as crews extricated him from the car and cleaned up the debris. Two other yellows closed the track for another ten minutes, and the day came to a close at 6 p.m. without a single car being able to make a qualifying attempt.

Second Day – Sunday May 13
Pole qualifying shifted to Sunday, with partly sunny skies and temperatures in the mid-60s. Due to the new technical rules for 1979, including pop-off valve settings and wastegate regulations, the speeds in time trials were not expected to reach those set in 1977–1978 (over ). A hectic, non-stop day of qualifying occurred, with no less than 45 cars pulling away for qualifying attempts.

Shortly before 1 p.m.

At 4 p.m., Tom Sneva (who won the pole position in 1977–1978) took to the track looking for his record third consecutive Indy 500 pole. There were only two cars left in line with a legitimate shot for the pole: A. J. Foyt and Rick Mears.

The final qualifier for the pole round was Rick Mears. His four-lap average of  won him his first of what would be record six career Indy 500 pole positions. Sneva was bumped to second on the grid.

At 4:50 p.m., the original pole qualifying round was over, and "Second Day" qualifying commenced. At the end of the day, the field was filled to 25 cars.

Practice – Week 2

Monday May 14
USAC announced that for the first time, the "pack-up rule" would be used during caution periods at the Indy 500. Like the format used in NASCAR and at other Indy car races, when the caution flag came out, the pace car would enter the track and pick up the leader. The remainder of the field would bunch up behind the pace car. The previous system, the Electro-PACER Light system, was scrapped.

Bobby Unser shook down a Penske back-up car, which some speculated would be for Mario Andretti. Andretti was participating in Formula One full-time in 1979 to defend his 1978 World Championship, and a scheduling conflict with Monaco was expected to keep Mario away from Indy in 1979.

Tuesday May 15
Bobby Unser continued to practice in the back-up car, but insisted it was to test nose configurations and not being prepared for another driver.

Wednesday May 16
Eldon Rasmussen crashed in turn three, but was not injured. Later, Roger Rager spun in turn 3, but did not make contact.

Thursday May 17
Billy Engelhart wrecked in turn 1, suffering a broken leg, and was sidelined for the rest of the month. Heavy activity amongst the numerous non-qualified cars was noted.

Friday May 18
The final full day of practice saw heavy activity with no incidents reported. Danny Ongais returned to the track to get ready to qualify, but Dr. Thomas A. Hanna, the Speedway medical director, would not clear him to drive for the day.

Despite some unfounded rumors circulating around the garage area, Mario Andretti decided not to skip Monaco, and would miss the Indy 500 for the first time since arriving as a rookie in 1965. Meanwhile, Indy rookie and NASCAR regular Neil Bonnett flew to Dover to qualify for the Mason-Dixon 500. He planned on putting in a qualifying time for the Winston Cup race on Friday, then returning Saturday to Indianapolis in order to qualify for the Indy 500. However, it rained in Dover on Friday, washing out Cup qualifying. NASCAR qualifying was shifted to Saturday, and due to the time constraints, Bonnett decided to withdraw from Indy. Jerry Sneva took over the car.  Bonnett went on to win the Dover NASCAR race, and never returned to Indy.

Time Trials – Weekend 2

Third Day – Saturday May 19
The third day of time trials saw heavy activity. The day opened with 8 spots available on the grid. His second and third laps, however, dropped off drastically, and his crew waved off.

Several cars went out in the first hour, and at 1:15 p.m., Jim McElreath filled the field to 33 cars. Larry Cannon was the first car on the bubble. Dick Simon bumped him out with ease. Tom Bigelow was now on the bubble. He survived three wave offs, but Jerry Sneva managed to bump him out at 2 p.m. Jerry Sneva's run was not without excitement, as he suffered a stuck throttle. Rather than wave off, he managed to control the engine with the kill switch, and completed the four laps without incident.

With John Martin now on the bubble, Dick Ferguson took to the track. His speed of  bumped Martin from the field. However, in post-inspection, Ferguson was disqualified and fined $5,000 for an illegal wastegate inlet. Rather than welding a washer inside of the wastegate like others had done, his mechanic Wayne Woodward had welded a complete obstruction in the pipe, attempting to illegally over-ride the popoff valve. Martin was re-instated to the field. Meanwhile, Tom Bigelow bumped out Steve Krisiloff as this was going on.

Martin didn't last long, as Steve Krisiloff got into his backup car and bumped him out a few minutes later. The day concluded with Larry Rice bumping out John Mahler.

After the track closed, USAC disqualified Steve Krisiloff and Tom Bigelow for the same infraction that Dick Ferguson was disqualified for earlier – illegal wastegate exhaust pipes and attempting to over-ride the pop-off valve. As a result, the bumped cars of John Mahler and John Martin were re-instated to the field.

Bump Day – Sunday May 20
After the disqualification of three cars on Saturday, USAC issued a memo clarifying their wastegate specifications. Some teams began to voice their complaints that it was not fair for USAC to essentially change the rules midway through time trials. With the increased scrutiny on the wastegate inlets, drivers claimed it was difficult for a legal car to bump out a car already in the field that had cheated, and that the officials were not policing it properly.

The final day scheduled for qualifying began on time around noon. Bill Alsup was the first car to make an attempt, and John Martin was bumped out of the field once again. Danny Ongais, who returned to the cockpit after his crash last weekend, followed suit by "re-bumping" John Mahler. Ongais had complained that USAC officials were deliberately preventing him from returning to the cockpit after his injury. However, after lobbying from his co-competitor and friend Al Unser, officials finally cleared him to drive.

Tom Bigelow and Steve Krisiloff, both whom were disqualified on Saturday, returned to the track, and bumped their way into the field. Dick Ferguson, however, was too slow, and exhausted his three attempts. Further complicating the day, USAC disqualified Bill Alsup for using the same engine that Bobby Unser had already qualified with.

The day ended with John Mahler taking the track at 5:59 p.m., and bumping his way back into the field.

Carburetion Day – Thursday May 24
After qualifying was closed, eight teams that failed to qualify filed a protest on Monday May 21. They charged that the turbocharger wastegate inlet rules were unfair, and there was too much of a gray area to begin with. In addition, they claimed that many cars that qualified during the first weekend of time trials were technically illegal, but that officials were only closely checking the cars that made attempts on the second weekend.

The protest was denied, but USAC president Dick King announced that the 11 cars that were bumped from the field would be allowed a special qualifying session if all 33 cars in the field signed a special agreement. Dick Ferguson was not among the 11 drivers named as eligible for the special session, so his car owner filed suit in county court on Tuesday to have the race halted until his car was re-instated. Part of the suit called for all 33 qualified cars to be summoned to court to have their wastegate pipes measured. The suit was dropped.

A total of 34 cars took laps, without any major incidents. Howdy Holmes blew an engine, Mike Mosley blew a transmission, and Salt Walther suffered a broken oil scavenger pump.

Of the 33 cars thus qualified, 31 took practice laps. Bill Vukovich II and Dana Carter were assigned as the alternates, and both took practice laps as well. Bob Harkey, however, was not eligible to practice, and pulled out on the track anyway. USAC officials black-flagged him, and made him return to the garage area.

By mid-day Thursday, only 31 of the 33 cars in the field signed the waiver agreeing to extend time trials. The proposal offered Monday was considered void since two teams refused to sign on.

Also that day the 3rd annual Miller Pit Stop Challenge was held. Team McLaren with driver Johnny Rutherford and Chief Mechanics Phil Sharp and Steve Roby won the contest. Runner up was team Jerry O'Connell with driver Tom Sneva.

Special Qualifying Session – Saturday May 26
On Friday May 25, USAC reversed their decision, and declared that in the best interest of the event, they would hold a special qualifying session Saturday morning for the 11 cars that were bumped from the field. The 33 cars that were already in the field were "locked in," and could not be bumped. Each of the eleven cars would be allowed only one attempt. There were no wave offs allowed, and if the run was incomplete, or if the driver missed their turn in line, the attempt was forfeited. If the driver completed the four-lap qualifying run faster than the slowest car in the field (Roger McCluskey at ), he would be added to the rear of the grid. That potentially meant that up to a record 44 cars could start on race day.

Only two cars, Bill Vukovich II and George Snider ran fast enough, and the final grid comprised 35 cars. Despite the record number of entries and expanded field, only one rookie, Howdy Holmes, qualified for the race. He would win the rookie of the year award by default.

Starting Lineup

Grid

Failed to Qualify

Participated in the special qualifying session
 First alternate: Dana Carter  (#30) – Too slow
 Bill Alsup  (#19, #41, #68 – Disqualified) – Wrecked during special time trials session
 Al Loquasto (#39) – Too slow
 Jerry Karl (#38) – Too slow
 Larry "Boom Boom" Cannon (#95) – Too slow
 John Martin (#20) – Too slow

Others

 Dick Ferguson  (#81) – Owner went to court to overturn disqualification; unsuccessful
 Todd Gibson  (#75) – Wrecked on third and final qualifying attempt
 Tom Frantz  (#16) – Spun during qualifying attempt
 Billy Scott (#28) – Waved off
 Hurley Haywood  (#51) – Too slow
 Gary Bettenhausen (#44, #98) – Too slow
 Jim Hurtubise (#56) – Incomplete Run
 Bill Puterbaugh (#35) – Incomplete run
 Neil Bonnett  (#73) – Blew engine morning of qualifying, did not make attempt
 Billy Engelhart  (#83) – Wrecked in practice, broken leg
 Frank Weiss  (#50) – Incomplete rookie test
 Tony Bettenhausen Jr.  (#23, #26)
 Earle Canavan 
 Ed Finley  (#62)
 Woody Fisher  (#52)
 Bob Harkey (#19)
 Larry McCoy (#93)
 Jerry Miller  (#97)
 Jan Opperman (#81)
 Roger Rager  (#66)

 = Indianapolis 500 rookie = Former Indianapolis 500 winner

Race summary

First half
Rain fell the night before the race, and the weather forecast for race day was bleak. However, in the morning, the skies cleared, the track dried, and the race began on-time as scheduled.

At the start, Al Unser Sr. swept from the outside of the front row, and led the field into turn one. Unser was driving Jim Hall's radical new Chaparral 2K chassis. He pulled out to a commanding lead, and proceeded to lead the first 24 laps. Heavy attrition early on saw seven cars out with mechanical problems by lap 22.

Cliff Hucul stalled on lap 28, bringing out the first caution during the first sequence of pit stops. As the field went back to green, Al Unser again dominated. On lap 43, Wally Dallenbach lost a wheel down the backstretch, and had to precariously guide his car back to the pits on three wheels.

With Al Unser still dominating, the rest of the top five was Rick Mears, Bobby Unser, and Johnny Rutherford.

Rutherford then headed to the pits with a broken gear. After lengthy repairs, he returned to the race. Leader Al Unser came in for a routine pit stop under the caution on lap 97. Moments later, he was back into the pits after it was reported that something may have been leaking or smoking from the back of the car. Still under the caution, after a quick consultation, Unser returned to the track. The green flag back came out with Bobby Unser now leading.

Second half
On lap 103, Al Unser Sr. was running second to Bobby Unser when heavy smoke and flames started coming from the back of the car. The Chaparral 2K experienced a failed transmission oil fitting, and Unser was out of the race. After mutual differences, Unser decided to leave the team at the end of the season.

With Al out, his brother Bobby was now in control. Rick Mears was holding second, and A. J. Foyt was moving up to third, one lap down.

The first crash of the day involved Larry Rice on lap 156.

With twenty laps to go, Bobby Unser led his Penske teammate Rick Mears by a few car lengths. A. J. Foyt was running third, one lap down. Suddenly on lap 181, Bobby Unser veered to the inside of the track. He was off the pace with gearbox trouble. That handed the lead to Rick Mears with 19 laps to go. Less than a lap later, A. J. Foyt (now in second) got by Mears to un-lap himself. Bobby Unser would stay out on the track and nursed his ailing car to a 5th-place finish in third gear.

Finish
Rick Mears made his final pit stop from the lead on lap 185. He took on fuel only, and no tires. A. J. Foyt followed, completing a fast 8.5-second pit stop. The leaders pits stops were over, and Mears now held a 38-second lead over Foyt.

Suddenly with 8 laps to go, Tom Sneva wrecked in turn four, bringing out the yellow, and bunching up the field. The green came back out for one last sprint to the finish with four laps to go. Rick Mears led, with A. J. Foyt at the tail-end of the pack. Mike Mosley was one lap down in third place, however, an early-race scoring error was tentatively showing him two laps down in 5th place. Foyt was mired in heavy traffic, and needed to pass at least 14 cars to catch up to Mears. With Foyt struggling to make up the ground, his engine lost a cylinder. Down on power, Foyt began to slow. Third-place Mosley, fighting to stay ahead of fourth-place Danny Ongais, un-lapped himself on the final lap and continued to charge. Meanwhile, Mears cruised unchallenged to the finish line. Mears in only his second start, won his first of four Indy 500 victories.

Coming off of turn four with the checkered flag waving, A. J. Foyt's engine quit. He pulled to the inside and was coasting down the frontstretch towards the finish line. Mike Mosley was storming down the frontstretch at full speed, but Foyt nipped him at the finish line by 2.3 seconds to hold on to second position. Though it was not known at the moment, Mosley's charge on the final lap nearly gave him second place. After the race, officials discovered a scoring error, and realized that Mosely was not credited with a lap at the start of the race. In the official results, Mosely was credited with third place, just behind Foyt.

Bill Vukovich II, who was one of only two drivers to make the field during the special Saturday qualifying session, charged all the way from 34th starting position to 8th at the finish.

Born in 1951, Rick Mears became the first Indy 500 winner born after World War II. It was also the last checkered flag for USAC chief starter/flagman Pat Vidan. This would be the final Indianapolis 500 participation for Team McLaren who left Indy car racing as a team all together until their return in 2017.

Race results

Box Score

 = Indianapolis 500 rookie = Former Indianapolis 500 winner Indicates diver eligible for CART Championship points only. Indicates driver eligible for USAC Championship Trail points only.

Race statistics

CART Points standings after this race
Note: Only the top 10 are listed

Rick Mears would ride the wave of this victory to the Inaugural CART Championship.

USAC Points standings after this race
Note: Only the top 10 are listed

This was one of two races Foyt would not win during the USAC Season as he won the other five out of seven races to easily take his seventh and final championship.

Broadcasting

Radio
The race was carried live on the IMS Radio Network. Paul Page served as anchor for the third year. Lou Palmer reported from victory lane. Billy Scott, who failed to qualify for the race, served as the "driver expert."

After 31 years on the broadcast, fourth turn reporter Jim Shelton retired from the crew. Bob Jenkins debuted on the backstretch, while Darl Wible moved to the vacant turn four position. Bob Forbes' primary duties again involved covering the garage area and roving reports. For 1979, a third level was added to the Turn Two Suites. Howdy Bell's vantage point on the roof of the suites building moved slightly higher than previous years.

Television
The race was carried in the United States on ABC Sports on a same-day tape delay basis. On-air color commentator Jackie Stewart was selected to drive the pace car at the start of the race. Stewart reported live while driving the Ford Mustang pace car.

The broadcast has re-aired on ESPN Classic since May 2011.

Gallery

Notes

See also
 1979 USAC Championship Car season
 1979 SCCA/CART Indy Car Series

References

Works cited
 1979 Indianapolis 500 Official Track Report
 Indianapolis 500 History: Race & All-Time Stats – Official Site
 1979 Indianapolis 500 Radio Broadcast, Indianapolis Motor Speedway Radio Network

Indianapolis 500 races
Indianapolis 500
Indianapolis 500
1979 in American motorsport
May 1979 sports events in the United States
Indianapolis 500 1979